Vadsar is a village in Abdasa Taluka, Kutch District, Gujarat, India. The population was 272 at the 2011 Indian census.

References

Villages in Kutch district